Ghanem Hamarsheh (born January 1, 1977) is a retired Jordanian footballer of Palestinian origin.

International goals

References
 Mark of Ghanem Hamarsheh's Retirement in Football

External links 
 
 

1977 births
Living people
Jordanian footballers
Jordan international footballers
Association football forwards
Sportspeople from Amman
Shabab Al-Hussein SC players
Al-Hussein SC (Irbid) players
Al-Jazeera (Jordan) players
Busaiteen Club players
Bahraini Premier League players
Jordanian Pro League players
Jordanian expatriate footballers
Jordanian expatriate sportspeople in Bahrain
Expatriate footballers in Bahrain